Isle of Caprice may refer to:
a hotel-casino on Dog Key Island, a barrier island off the coast of Mississippi
an episode of The Ant and the Aardvark
Isle of Capri Casinos, a US-based gaming company